818 Naval Air Squadron was a Royal Navy Fleet Air Arm carrier-based squadron formed in August 1939. It served on a number of the Navy's aircraft carriers during the Second World War, serving in most of the theatres of the war, before decommissioning at the end of the war.

History

Norway and the Mediterranean
818 Squadron was formed as a torpedo reconnaissance squadron at Evanton in August 1939. This was some two months earlier than had originally been planned, owing to the increased threat of war. The squadron was initially equipped with nine Fairey Swordfish Is, and then embarked on the aircraft carrier  at the navy's base at Scapa Flow. On 11 April aircraft from the squadron attacked two German destroyers in Trondheim Fjord.

The squadron then moved ashore, spending the period between May and June 1940 flying out of Thorney and RAF Carew Cheriton, working with RAF Coastal Command in the English Channel. They returned to Ark Royal in mid-June, and sailed with her to the Mediterranean Sea. They were used in the Attack on Mers-el-Kébir, carrying out strikes against the Vichy-French battleship . They were also involved in providing air cover for the Malta Convoys, and in February 1941 carried out attacks on targets at Livorno, Genoa, Pisa and La Spezia.

Hunting the battleship Bismarck
When the Bismarck was located, aircraft from 810 and 818 Naval Air Squadrons carried out attacks. Eventually a Swordfish of 818 Squadron, probably the one piloted by Sub-Lt. John Moffat, struck Bismarcks aft with a torpedo, jamming her rudder in a turn to starboard. Unable to manoeuvre, the Bismarck swung around in a wide circle, allowing the ships of Force H to catch up and sink the German ship.

The Mediterranean and Far East
The squadron later had their Swordfish replaced by nine Fairey Albacore Is, and they were embarked aboard  in February 1942.  Formidable then sailed to Ceylon to counter Japanese attacks, but by June a reduction in the threat of such attacks led to the squadron being disbanded.  It was reformed at RNAS Lee-on-Solent in October 1942 and was equipped with Swordfish IIs.  They sailed aboard  in March 1943 to provide cover for convoys to Gibraltar.  Six aircraft from the squadron were used that August for operations during the Allied invasion of Sicily.

The squadron then returned to the Far East aboard Unicorn in November 1943, where they were assigned to the Eastern Fleet.  They went ashore at Ceylon, and were disbanded at Cochin in October 1944.  They were again reformed, this time at RNAS Rattray in May 1945, and equipped with 18 Fairey Barracuda IIs, to operate as a torpedo bomber reconnaissance squadron.  It had been planned that the squadron would join the 22nd Carrier Air Group in one of the new s, but the end of the war with Japan in August 1945 meant that the squadron was again disbanded, on Victory over Japan Day, 15 August.

Notes

References
818 Squadron at the Fleet Air Arm Archive

“With Gallantry and Determination” The Story of the Torpedoing of the Bismarck, Mark E. Horan

Military units and formations established in 1939
800 series Fleet Air Arm squadrons